Aydıncık is a Turkish place name and may refer to:

 Aydıncık, Mersin, a town and district of Mersin Province
 Aydıncık, Yozgat, a town and district of Yozgat Province
 Aydıncık, Bayburt, a village in Bayburt Province
 Aydıncık, Bolu, a village in Bolu Province
 Aydıncık, Elâzığ
 Aydıncık, Gazipaşa, a village in Antalya Province
 Aydıncık, Refahiye
 Aydıncık, Yüreğir, a village in Adana Province
 Cyzicus, an ancient town, today in Balıkesir Province